George Ross Robertson (April 20, 1933 – January 29, 2023) was a Canadian actor perhaps best known for his roles in the first six Police Academy films and the film JFK. He guest-starred on an episode of The Twilight Zone (1980s version). He also played Dick Cheney in The Path to 9/11. Robertson had 80 acting credits to his name.

Robertson died in Toronto, Ontario on January 29, 2023, at the age of 89.

Awards
In 1993, Robertson was awarded the Margaret Collier Award.

In 2004, he won the Humanitarian Award at the Gemini Awards.

Robertson appeared in three films that were nominated for the Academy Award for Best Picture: 1970's Airport, 1979's Norma Rae and JFK in 1991.

Filmography

References

External links

1933 births
2023 deaths
20th-century Canadian male actors
21st-century Canadian male actors
Canadian male film actors
Canadian male television actors
Male actors from Ontario